Be-Ge Hockey Center, formerly Arena Oskarshamn, is the home ice of Swedish ice-hockey team IK Oskarshamn, located in the south-east of Sweden. The arena was completely rebuilt and renovated in 2004-2005 and has a capacity of 3 275 people (2018/2019).

The arena, earlier known as Oskarshamns ishall, was inaugurated on 10 November 1974, with a game where Old Team Sweden defeated IK Oskarshamn, back then known as IK70, 6–2, in front of 2 600 spectators. The first international game inside the arena was played on 15 December 1974, a junior game where the Soviet Union defeated Sweden, 5–2.

References

Indoor ice hockey venues in Sweden
1974 establishments in Sweden
Sports venues completed in 1974